Florida's 14th House District elects one member of the Florida House of Representatives. This district is located in Northeast Florida, and encompasses part of the First Coast, as well as part of the Jacksonville metropolitan area. The district covers northwestern Duval County, including much of Northside neighborhood and parts of Westside and Downtown Jacksonville. The largest city in the district is Jacksonville, though it only contains part of the city. As of the 2010 Census, the district's population is 155,895. This district is majority-minority.

The district contains Jacksonville International Airport.

There was a vacancy in 1988 as the incumbent, Carl Ogden, resigned. Teacher Stephen R. Wise won a special election to fill the seat.

As of 2020, the district is represented by Angie Nixon.

Representatives from 1967 to the present

See also 

 Florida's 4th Senate district
 Florida's 6th Senate district
 Florida's 4th congressional district
 Florida's 5th congressional district

References 

14
Duval County, Florida
Jacksonville, Florida